Marina Mall Accra is a shopping center located at Airport City Accra in the Greater Accra Region of Ghana

References

Buildings and structures in Accra
Shopping malls in Ghana
Shopping malls established in 2008